The first cabinet of Anfinn Kallsberg was the government of the Faroe Islands from 15 May 1998 until 6 June 2002. It was a coalition with Anfinn Kallsberg from the People's Party (Fólkaflokkurin) as Prime Minister, consisting of People's Party, Republic and Self-Government Party.

References 

Cabinets of the Faroe Islands
1998 in the Faroe Islands
1999 in the Faroe Islands
2000 in the Faroe Islands
2001 in the Faroe Islands
2002 in the Faroe Islands